Japanese football in 1929.

Emperor's Cup

Births
April 10 - Yozo Aoki
August 31 - Osamu Yamaji

External links

 
Seasons in Japanese football